Radio NFM 98.1 is a South African community radio station based in Northern Cape.
The preparation and research phases date back to 1996 since the concept of community radio was introduced to the people of Namaqualand by the then Independent Broadcasting Authority (IBA) and it became a registered organisation in 2003.

Coverage areas 
It has an area of coverage of 120 km/r, centered on Okiep 
Springbok
Keetmanshoop
Vanrynsdorp
Alexander Bay
Pofadder
Rigtersveld
Okiep
Lutzville (30 Towns Surrounding Springbok)
100 km into Namibia.

Broadcast languages
Afrikaans
English
Nama
Xhosa

Broadcast time
24/7

Target audience
Community

Programme format
40% Talk
60% Music

Listenership figures

Location
The station's physical address is:
2 Main Road, Okiep

References

External links
 Official Website
 SAARF Website

Community radio stations in South Africa
Mass media in the Northern Cape